St Stephen-in-Brannel (known locally as St Stephen's or St Stephen) is a civil parish and village in mid Cornwall, England, United Kingdom. St Stephen village is four miles (6.5 km) west of St Austell on the southern edge of Cornwall's china clay district. The parish also contains the villages of Foxhole, Nanpean, Treviscoe and Whitemoor, and the hamlets of Carpalla, Coombe, Currian Vale, High Street, Hornick, Lanjeth, Stepaside and Terras. The population of the civil parish at the 2011 census was 7,119. An electoral ward also exists simply bearing the name St. Stephen. The population at the same census was 4,772 only.

History
In medieval times the parish lay within the royal manor of Brannel. St Dennis and St Michael Caerhays were daughter churches. From the 16th century the rectors resided at the latter so that it came to be regarded as the mother church. The manor of Brannel was recorded in the Domesday Book (1086) when it was held by Robert, Count of Mortain and there were one and a half hides of land. There was land for 20 ploughs; the lord had half a hide of land with 3 ploughs and 10 serfs; 12 villeins and 18 smallholders had the rest of the land with 6 ploughs. There were 40 acres of woodland and 8 square leagues of pasture. The livestock was 2 cattle, 20 unbroken mares and 150 sheep. The value of the manor was £12-18s–4d though it had formerly been worth 12 silver marks (i.e. £8 sterling).

The church was dedicated to St Stephen by Walter Bronescombe, bishop of Exeter on 20 August 1261. The church has a nave and two aisles; the font is Norman. The exterior stonework is all of granite. The tower is built of granite blocks and contains a peal of 8 bells re-cast from the old bells by Taylor's of Loughborough in 1908. The previous ring consisted of 6 bells, first cast by Rudhall of Gloucester in 1730, probably by Abraham Rudhall II. Taylor's preserved the inscriptions from the old bells. The architect George Fellowes Prynne carried out a restoration of the church between 1893 and 1894. This included the painting of the church's high altar panels by the well-known late Pre-Raphaelite painter Edward Arthur Fellowes Prynne, brother of the architect.

Treneague Cross consists of an ancient cross head mounted on a modern shaft. The cross head was found at Treneague at the end of the 19th century and afterwards attached to a new shaft and set up in the churchyard. Treneague was the site of a chapel which was licensed in 1381.

Mining
Mining has had a large impact on the growth of the area. St Stephen grew with the discovery by William Cookworthy of clay deposits in the surrounding area during the 18th century. Uranium was mined at South Terras Mine, a short distance from the village between 1870 and 1930 and in 1996 the mine was notified as a Site of Special Scientific Interest.  Contamination and migration of uranium contamination in surface soils at South Terras has been shown to be attenuated by arsenic, through formation of the mineral metazeunerite Cu(UO2)2(AsO4)2·8H2O. Tregargus Quarries to the north west of the churchtown is a Geological Conservation Review site and designated a SSSI in 1951.

The village

The growth of the village meant that it soon sustained many services including a police station, bank and bakery at different times.

St Stephen continues to grow, with new housing schemes being proposed and accepted. The need for affordable housing in the village has seen the use of greenfield sites surrounding the village, which has met with some controversy between residents and developers because of the impact on privacy and wildlife.

Amenities in the village include the Brannel Surgery, St Stephen Churchtown Primary School, Brannel School (secondary), a community centre, two public houses, one of these, the King's Arms, has closed and is now a residential home. There are also two shops, one of which is also the post office.

In 2012, the post box outside the post office was painted gold by the Royal Mail to honour local Paralympic swimmer Jonathan Fox.

Education
St Stephen incorporates two schools, one catering for primary years and one for secondary.

St Stephen Churchtown Primary was opened in 1984, after the school moved from the centre of the village to a new school building, which has continued to grow over recent years. The school currently has over 250 pupils across 11 classes.

Brannel School opened in 1961 and currently has over 700 pupils on roll. The school has moved into a new building, which involved the demolition of structures on the old site. This was completely separate to the government programme 'Building Schools for the future' and therefore became unaffected when the coalition government scrapped the programme. The new school caters for up to 750 pupils which includes pupils who may require access to the Area Resource Base (ARB) – a special wing of the school to cater for pupils with special educational/medical needs. This area is fully integrated into the new school giving its pupils the individual support they may sometimes need, while still allowing access to the main school when able/required.

Brannel was named a 'Beacon School' by the government in 2000, and became a specialist college for English and the Performing Arts in 2005.

Recreation
The recreation ground was opened in 1924, and houses a number of clubs and organisations including the village football, cricket and bowls teams, and also Telstar Youth Club.

The ground is equipped with a football pitch, cricket wicket, bowls green, all-weather pitch and sports pavilion which can be used for sports including football and tennis.

In 2007 the recreation ground opened a new playground and skateboarding facilities after fundraising to replace the old equipment.

Clubs and societies
The parish is home to many sports teams, societies and clubs.

Sports clubs include a bowls team who play on the bowling green at the recreation ground, a cricket team who play their home games at the recreation ground and make use of the new pavilion opened in 2001, and two football teams within St Stephen FC, who play their home games on their pitch in the recreation ground. There are also a number of other sports clubs which make use of the sports hall and other facilities at Brannel School.

St Stephen also has a Scout group, 1st St Stephen, who share a meeting place with 1st Treviscoe-St Stephen Guide group at Trethosa. As well as a Guide group, who as of now meets in the primary school.

St Stephen Pantomime Company produce a show annually, which is performed in the community centre hall and can attract audiences of up to 200 people per night.

See also

People from St Stephen-in-Brannel.

Two other villages in Cornwall are dedicated to St Stephen; St Stephen by Launceston and St Stephen by Saltash

References

External links

 GENUKI website; St Stephen in Brannel
 Cornwall Record Office Online Catalogue for St Stephen in Brannel

Villages in Cornwall
Civil parishes in Cornwall
Sites of Special Scientific Interest in Cornwall